Ras-related protein Rab-37 is a protein that in humans is encoded by the RAB37 gene.

Rab proteins are low molecular mass GTPases that are critical regulators of vesicle trafficking. For additional background information on Rab proteins, see MIM 179508.[supplied by OMIM]

References

Further reading